Pavel Khristoforovich Dubinda (– 22 October 1992) was a sergeant in the Red Army during World War II and one of only four people that was both a full bearer of the Order of Glory and Hero of the Soviet Union.

Early life
After completing his seventh grade of school he worked on a fish farm before entering the navy in 1936.

World War II
During the very initial phase of the German invasion of the Soviet Union he was stationed on the Chervona Ukraina, on which he participated in the defense of Odessa and Sevastopol. After the cruiser was bombed and the crew ordered to abandon ship in November 1941 he was assigned to the 8th Marine Rifle Brigade. Captured in battle, he was held in several POW camps before managing to successfully escape and return to the Red Army in 1944. Upon his return he entered the 293rd Guards Rifle Regiment. Soon he was awarded the Order of Glory 3rd class on 5 September 1944 for being the first in his squad to enter an enemy trench on 8 August 1944, killing seven enemy soldiers in the process. Later that month his actions in the battle for a railway station in Poland resulted in him being awarded Order of Glory 2nd class on 5 October 1944. In the ensuing combat, he replaced his wounded company commander to continue pursuing the attack, and personally killed ten enemy soldiers. After being the first to enter an enemy trench again during the battles for Peshiken in East Prussia from 22-25 October, he personally killed four enemy soldiers and captured an officer. Doing so made him eligible for the Order of Glory 1st class, which was awarded on 24 March 1945. Less than two weeks before becoming a full bearer of the Order of Glory he saw heavy combat in the battle for Königsberg. On 15 March his platoon took Bladiau village, but soon the Axis launched a heavy counterattack, launching artillery at Dubinda's position. His platoon fought until their ammunition ran out, after which Dubinda took an enemy machine gun and began firing point-blank on enemy forces. Chasing the retreating enemy, his platoon managed to capture 40 soldiers and 4 officers in a courtyard they took over. For his actions in Königsberg he was awarded the title Hero of the Soviet Union on 29 June 1945, making him the first person who was both a full bearer of the Order of Glory and a Hero of the Soviet Union.

Postwar

Demobilized in August 1945, Dubinda worked in the antarctic whaling fleet. For the remainder of his life he lived in Kherson until his death on 22 October 1992.

Awards 
 Hero of the Soviet Union (29 June 1945)
 Order of Lenin (29 June 1945)
 Order of Glory 1st class (24 March 1945)
 Order of Glory 2nd class (5 October 1944)
 Order of Glory 3rd class (5 September 1944)
 Order of Bogdan Khmelnitsky 3rd class (6 April 1945)
 Order of the Patriotic War 1st class (11 March 1985)
 campaign and jubilee medals

See also
 Ivan Drachenko
 Andrey Alyoshin
 Nikolai Kuznetsov

References

1914 births
1992 deaths
People from Kherson Oblast
People from Khersonsky Uyezd
Soviet military personnel of World War II
Soviet prisoners of war
Heroes of the Soviet Union
Recipients of the Order of Glory
Recipients of the Order of Bogdan Khmelnitsky (Soviet Union), 3rd class
Ukrainian people of World War II
Soviet military personnel of World War II from Ukraine